Coleophora barbaricina is a moth of the family Coleophoridae. It is found on Sardinia.

References

barbaricina
Moths described in 1980
Endemic fauna of Italy
Moths of Europe